Pangodi Landscape Conservation Area is a nature park which is located in Tartu County, Estonia.

The area of the nature park is 383 ha.

The protected area was founded in 1957 to protect Pikksaare Park and Palumäed Hills near Pangodi Lake. In 1964, the borders were widened. In 2001, the protected area was designated to the landscape conservation area.

References

Nature reserves in Estonia
Geography of Tartu County